Earle R. Burkins (died September 16, 1949) was an American politician from Maryland. He served as a member of the Maryland House of Delegates, representing Harford County, from 1939 to 1949.

Early life
Earle R. Burkins was born in Castleton, Maryland, to William A. Burkins.

Career
Burkins served with the 29th Infantry Division during World War I.

Burkins was a Democrat. Burkins served as a member of the Maryland House of Delegates, representing Harford County, from 1939 to his death in 1949. Burkins served as mayor of Bel Air, Maryland, for 14 years. Burkins served as chair of the town commission of Bel Air from 1940 to 1946. He served as an inspector of the State Racing Commission.

Burkins served as a commander of Harford Post No. 39 of the American Legion.

Personal life
Burkins married Mosena Warren.

Burkins died on September 16, 1949, at the age of 57, of a heart attack while fishing on the Patuxent River. He was buried at Bel Air Memorial Gardens.

References

Year of birth uncertain
1890s births
1949 deaths
People from Harford County, Maryland
United States Army personnel of World War I
Democratic Party members of the Maryland House of Delegates
Mayors of Bel Air, Maryland